Chen Kejiang (born 18 January 1997) is a Chinese footballer currently playing as a defender for Chongqing Lifan.

Club career
Chen Kejiang was promoted to the senior team of Chongqing Lifan within the 2020 Chinese Super League season and would make his debut in a Chinese FA Cup game on 19 September 2020 against Shanghai SIPG F.C. in a 3-2 defeat.

Career statistics

References

External links

1997 births
Living people
Chinese footballers
Association football defenders
Shanghai Port F.C. players
Chongqing Liangjiang Athletic F.C. players